This is a list of seasons completed by the Stonehill College Skyhawks men's ice hockey team.

Season-by-season results

* Winning percentage is used when conference schedules are unbalanced.

Footnotes

References

 
Lists of college men's ice hockey seasons in the United States
Stonehill Skyhawks ice hockey seasons